The Belvidere Assembly Plant (BVAP) is an idled automobile production facility owned and operated by Stellantis North America. The factory opened in 1965 in Belvidere, Illinois, United States, and last assembled the Jeep Cherokee.

History 
The factory was built in 1964 and 1965 in the south part of Belvidere, Illinois, adjacent to U.S. Route 20. The first production line vehicle was made on July 7, 1965, assembling the new Chrysler C platform vehicles.

The Belvidere Assembly Plant is adjacent to the Chrysler operated Belvidere Satellite Stamping Plant. The stamping plant produces sheet metal parts for the production line.

In 2006, the factory became the first Chrysler plant to use a body shop consisting entirely of robotics. The 780 robots in the body shop can make necessary tool changes automatically, within a 47-second cycle time. The factory is capable of building three models of vehicles as well as test-building a fourth vehicle.

The Simulation (SIM) Room comprises  of the factory and is used to create a miniature production process and to test the layout of job stations, and creating standard work instructions. A two-foot grid is painted on the floor to measure dimensions and employee walk-time during simulated production and efficiency modeling.

In October 2010, it was announced that $600 million was to be invested into the Belvidere Assembly Plant in preparation for 2012-model-year vehicles to be built there. The Dodge Dart (PF) was announced in December of 2011 to be built at the plant. 

Union Pacific provides rail freight for the plant.

On December 9, 2022 Belvidere Assembly was placed into indefinite closure effective February 28, 2023.

Labor
In 1985 there were 4,000 employees working at the plant. At the start of the Neon car production, there were 3,250 hourly and 250 salaried employees working as of 10 November 1993.

2,650 employees were working at the factory at the start of 2007 model year Jeep Compass production, up from 1,700 in 2005 when one shift of employees was in place. However, the third shift, which was first instituted in 2006, was discontinued in 2008. The plant was idled during the Chrysler bankruptcy filing and became a one-shift operation from July 2009. A 'temporary' second shift was added by October 2009. In May 2019, Chrysler laid off 1,403 employees after the "C" shift was eliminated.

Production of vehicles dropped from 263,521 in 2008 to 84,609 in 2009.

The workforce is represented by the United Auto Workers, Local 1268 and 1761. There have been two UAW-ordered strikes in the plant's history. In 1973, there was a nine-day strike over the right to turn down overtime, pension funding, and health and safety measures. In 1981, there was a nine-day strike to receive pay parity with Ford and GM workers. Chrysler proposed eliminating several job classifications so workers could be required to perform more than one task.

In 2009 the future of the plant was uncertain. Haig Stoddard, a Global Insight analyst, cited the plant as one of three plants that had been considered in a plan to close one plant.

Awards
In 2005, the factory was the recipient of Plant Engineering's Top Plant Award for efficient turnover in the changeover from Neon production to Caliber production.

American College of Occupational and Environmental Medicine's (ACOEM) Corporate Health Achievement Award awarded to the Chrysler Group after a tour of Belvidere Assembly Plant.

National Safety Council 2004 Green Cross for Safety.

The J.D. Power Awards for Manufacturing Quality, Bronze was given to the plant in 2020.

Vehicles produced

Current 
Jeep Cherokee (2017–2023)

Past 
Some of the past models made at the plant included:

Dodge Polara/Plymouth Fury/Chrysler Town & Country (station wagon)
Dodge Omni/Plymouth Horizon (1978-1987)
Dodge Charger (L-body) (1982-1987)
Chrysler New Yorker (1988-1993)
Dodge Dynasty (1988-1993)
Chrysler Imperial (1990-1993)
Chrysler New Yorker Fifth Avenue (1990-1993)
Plymouth Neon (1994-2001)
Dodge Neon (1994-2005)
Dodge Caliber (2007-2012)
Dodge Dart (2013–2016) (1965-1968)
Jeep Compass (2007–2016)
Jeep Patriot (2007–2016)

References

External links
 

Chrysler factories
Motor vehicle assembly plants in Illinois
Belvidere, Illinois